The Junior League World Series Europe–Africa Region is one of six International regions that currently sends teams to the World Series in Taylor, Michigan. The region's participation in the JLWS dates back to 1990.

Europe–Africa Region Countries

 (USA)

Region Champions
As of the 2022 Junior League World Series.

Results by Country
As of the 2022 Junior League World Series.

See also
Europe–Africa Region in other Little League divisions
Little League
Intermediate League
Senior League
Big League

References

Europe-Africa